The Asahi Hai Futurity Stakes (朝日杯フューチュリティステークス) is a one mile turf stakes race for thoroughbred colts two years old. It is considered the de facto year-end championship for Japanese thoroughbred racing in the two-year-olds division.

This race had been held in Nakayama Racecourse. From 2014, the race is moved to Hanshin Racecourse near Osaka.

Winners since 1984

See also
 Horse racing in Japan
 List of Japanese flat horse races

References
Racing Post: 

External links 
 Horse Racing in Japan

Flat horse races for two-year-olds
Horse races in Japan
Turf races in Japan